Tâm Đoan is a Vietnamese-Canadian singer. She and her sister Kristine changed their family name to "Sa" when they started their singing careers.

Discography

Van Son Entertainment:  (ordered by CD number)
 Tiếng Còi Trong Sương Đêm  (CD1587)
 Anh Co Nghe Mua Roi  (CD1590)
 Chong Xa  (CD3100)
 Loi Thu Xua  (CD3354)
 Em Con Be Lam Anh Oi  (CD3364)
 Chuyen Tau Hoang Hon  (CD3385)
 Tam Anh Khong Hon  (CD3417)
 Mua Thu Co Nho  (CD3451)
 Dem Giot Sau Roi  (CD3461)
 Chuyen Tinh Di Vang  (CD13738)
 Go Cua / Gia Sang Mua
 Dang Do  (CD21585)
 Nhung Chuyen Tinh Bat Tu

Thúy Nga:  (ordered by CD number)
 Người Mang Tâm Sự  (TNCD281)
 Do Chieu w/ Phuong Diem Hanh (TNCD329)
 Kiep Ngheo w/ Phuong Diem Hanh
 Yêu Vội (TNCD349)
 Gục Ngã Vì Yêu (TNCD377)
 Tam Su Nguoi Linh Tre w/ Quang Lê
 

Tam Doan Entertainment: (ordered by CD number)
 Giong Ca Di Vang
 Sau Le Bong
 Tinh Yeu Chua Cao Voi (Thanh Ca)(AsiaCDCS44)

Tinh Music Production: 
 Som Chong/May Chieu
 Lien Khuc Buon Nhu Hoa Phuong w/ Quoc Dung (Duy Truong) & Tuong Nguyen
 The Best Of Tam Doan "Giot Buon Khong Ten" 2CDs

Asia Entertainment:
 Xin Thoi Gian Qua Mau
 Lien Khuc: Dem Buon Tinh Le - Nhung Doi Hoa Sim
 Tuyet Lanh w/ Dang The Luan (AsiaCD293)

References

External links
 

1977 births
Living people
People from Bình Dương Province
Vietnamese emigrants to Canada
21st-century Vietnamese women singers
Vietnamese-language singers
Canadian musicians of Vietnamese descent
21st-century Canadian women singers